John Keen was the Speaker of the Legislative Assembly of British Columbia from 1916 to 1920. He succeeded John Walter Weart.  He was a member of Liberal Party and had won the election for 14th Parliament of British Columbia from the constituency of Kaslo.

References

Speakers of the Legislative Assembly of British Columbia
British Columbia Liberal Party MLAs
Year of birth missing